Vibeke Kruse (died 1648) was the official mistress of King Christian IV of Denmark between 1629 and 1648 and the mother of one of his three acknowledged, illegitimate sons, Ulrik Christian Gyldenløve. She was described as influential.

Life 

Not much is known of her background, but it is believed that her parents were from Germany.  Kruse had been servant of King Christian's spouse, Kirsten Munk.  She was fired in 1628, and employed by Munk's mother, Ellen Marsvin. 

In 1629, Christian was invited by Marsvin to her estate, where he met Kruse, and she became the King's mistress after his breakup with Munk the same year. It has been suggested, that Marsvin encouraged this.    In 1631, she was given an allowance and the estate Bramstedt in Holstein.   In 1645, the French ambassador reported that she had a great deal of influence on the King.   In 1646, when the Crown Prince asked his father for money, he was told to ask her.  She was blamed for having turned Christian against his spouse and his morganatic children.

After the King's death in 1648, Corfitz Ulfeldt and Kirsten Munk tried to sue her.  They sealed her estates, turned her and her daughter out of the royal palace and demanded an extraordinary trial, where the law could be set aside.  
The trial never occurred, as she died of natural causes shortly thereafter.

Kruse's enemies saw to it that she was buried unnoticed and without ceremony in a cemetery outside the city walls. In 1652 her body was moved to Kølstrup Church on the island of Funen.

Issue 
She had the following children;

Ulrik Christian Gyldenløve (1630–1658)
Elisabeth Sophie Gyldenløve (1633–1654); married Major-General Klaus Ahlefeld.

References

 Lars Bisgaard, Claus Bjørn, Michael Bregnsbo, Merete Harding, Kurt Villads Jensen, Knud J. V. Jespersen, Danmarks Konger og Dronninger (Copenhagen, 2004)
  Dansk Kvindebiografisk Leksikon kvinfo.dk (in Danish)

External links
 Vibeke Kruse at the website of the Royal Danish Collection

1648 deaths
Mistresses of Christian IV of Denmark
17th-century Danish women
Year of birth unknown